Anders Myrvold (born 12 August 1975) is a Norwegian former professional ice hockey player, who last played for Norwegian GET-ligaen club Frisk Tigers. He made his National Hockey League (NHL) debut for the Colorado Avalanche on 6 October 1995, and has been part of the Norwegian national team. In the NHL, Myrvold played for Colorado (he was drafted by the team's predecessor, the Quebec Nordiques), Boston Bruins, New York Islanders, and Detroit Red Wings. He played four games in the 1995–96 Colorado Avalanche season when they became Stanley Cup Champions. Myrvold did not play enough games to have his name engraved on the Stanley Cup.

Personal life

Assault and head injury
On 23 December 2006, Myrvold was assaulted after a Christmas party in Oslo. He received injuries to his head and successfully underwent surgery at Ullevål university hospital. Despite all his struggles he managed to come back to the ice, and was an important part of the success when the national team reached the quarter-finals at the 2008 IIHF World Championship in Canada.

Cocaine abuse
In November 2007 Myrvold told the Norwegian newspaper Verdens Gang that he had been abusing cocaine for a lengthy period of time. His first time trying the drug was at a party following a game in Detroit. At the time of the interview Myrvold had just finished a 7-week rehab program.

A three-year contract with Stavanger Oilers which Myrvold had signed in June 2008 was cancelled by the club in June 2009 after Myrvold had refused to undergo a drug test which the club had mandated, suspecting that his substance abuse had returned.

Assault charge 
In 2010, Myrvold was charged with assault for resisting arrest after allegedly attacking a guest at a restaurant with a golf club.

Career statistics

Regular season and playoffs

International

References

External links

1975 births
Living people
Adler Mannheim players
AIK IF players
Boston Bruins players
Colorado Avalanche players
Cornwall Aces players
Detroit Red Wings players
Djurgårdens IF Hockey players
Färjestad BK players
Frisk Asker Ishockey players
GCK Lions players
Grand Rapids Griffins players
HC Fribourg-Gottéron players
Hershey Bears players
Laval Titan Collège Français players
New York Islanders players
Norwegian victims of crime
Norwegian expatriate ice hockey people
Norwegian expatriate sportspeople in Canada
Norwegian expatriate sportspeople in the United States
Norwegian ice hockey defencemen
People from Lørenskog
Providence Bruins players
Quebec Nordiques draft picks
Springfield Falcons players
Stavanger Oilers players
Stjernen Hockey players
Storhamar Dragons players
Vålerenga Ishockey players
ZSC Lions players
Sportspeople from Viken (county)